Kingfisher Sky is a Dutch progressive metal band from Netherlands, created and led by drummer Ivar de Graaf (formerly of Within Temptation).

History
The history of Kingfisher Sky started in 2001, after drummer Ivar de Graaf left Within Temptation, to pursue his own musical interests, and founded Jambone, with the idea to cover classic rock bands. The band featured Edo Van Der Kolk on lead guitar and Michiel Parqui on bass guitar. Edo had already known Ivar for fifteen years and the trio had been playing together since high school, experimenting with various styles of music. They found a lead vocalist in the classically trained singer Judith Rijnveld and, when Zelda Weski joined as backing vocalist, the line-up was completed. Too widespread are the musical influences of Ivar and together with Judith as the songwriter they explored a way to combine their compositions into songs that didn't bound themselves to a specified genre or weren't tied to a particular single style, with the two female voices giving soul and melody to contrast the heavy groove-oriented music.

The band released a 5-track demo in January 2002, but unfortunately Michiel and Zelda left in October 2003 and Edo took a hiatus. One year later, Ivar decided to change the name to Kingfisher Sky and the duo started recording songs in their home studio in 2005. At an early stage, Eric Hoogendoorn was chosen as the permanent bassist and guitarist Daan Janzing, who was introduced by Ruud Jollie (Within Temptation), was recruited next. George van Olffen on keyboards followed soon after. This resulted in a demo containing 11 tracks in October 2006 and a record deal with Suburban Records was signed in the same year. Edo appeared on the demo as a guest musician, playing a guitar solo on the demo version of "Through My Eyes", before returning full-time in 2007, completing the band for the time being.

In June 2007 they recorded their first album, produced by Jochem Jacobs (Textures) and Bouke Visser (Split Second Sound), in various studios under the inspiring leadership of the producer duo. Hallway of Dreams was released in October of the same year and received with great reviews and, since then, the band has completed numerous shows as support for related bands such as Delain and Epica with a successful headline tour throughout the Netherlands followed. Within the scope of a special show in their hometown, Kingfisher Sky was joined by classical cellist Maaike Peterse, who played along on "Big Fish". As this cooperation proved to be very successful, Maaike soon became the seventh band member. In March 2008, Laser's Edge Records released Hallway of Dreams in the United States (Riverside, Zero Hour). Japan followed in 2008 (Disk Union). It was also released on Vinyl by Tonefloat Records (Porcupine Tree, Roger Waters). Meanwhile, Hallway of Dreams is also available in United Kingdom, Italy, France and Germany.

George van Olffen left the band in July 2009 to pursue other musical interests. With René Merkelbach the band found a new keyboardist, until David Gutierrez Rojas joined in November 2010. In April 2010, the band announced that guitarist Daan Janzing was about to leave Kingfisher Sky in order to fully concentrate on his other band My Favorite Scar. The new guitarist is Chris Henny. Kingfisher Sky released their second album 'Skin of The Earth' on 23 September 2010.

In May 2014 Eric Hoogendoorn left Kingfisher Sky and he was replaced by Nick Verschoor. After a successful crowdfunding campaign the money was raised to start recording their third album, Arms of Morpheus, which was released in October 2014. The album features Kristoffer Gildenlöw on bass on several tracks. In the beginning of 2016, keyboardplayer David Guiterrez Rojaz left the band to pursue other interests. He was replaced with Erik van Ittersum (Ayreon). A few months later, guitarist Chris Henny also parted ways with the band, that has continued as a six piece ever since.

Style
Ivar's progressive rock and traditional folk music influences collided with Judith's classical conservatory background, and also her preference for soul. Combined with their mutual love for bands and artists, like Aretha Franklin, Porcupine Tree, Jethro Tull, Peter Gabriel, Kate Bush, Tori Amos, Cecilia Bartoli, Mother's Finest, King's X, Skunk Anansie, Anouk, Heart, Clannad, Mike Oldfield and Pink Floyd, new songs were written.

Line-up
Current band members
 Ivar de Graaf – drums, additional guitars and keyboards (2001–present)
 Judith Rijnveld – lead vocals (2001–present)
 Edo Van Der Kolk – lead guitar (2001–2003, 2007–present)
 Maaike Peterse – cello (2008–present)
 Nick Verschoor – bass guitar and double bass (2014–present)
 Erik van Ittersum – keyboards (2016–present)

Former Band Members
 Michiel Parqui – bass guitar (2001–2003)
 Zelda Weski – backing vocals (2001–2003)
 George van Olffen – keyboards (2006–2009)
 Daan Janzing – lead and rhythm guitars (2006–2010)
 Eric Hoogendoorn – bass guitar (2006–2014)
 René Merkelbach – keyboards (2009–2010)
 David Gutierrez Rojas – keyboards (2010–2016)
 Chris Henny – rhythm guitar (2010–2016)

Timeline

Discography
Studio albums
2007: Hallway of Dreams
2010: Skin of the Earth
2014: Arms of Morpheus
2018: Technicoloured Eyes

Demos
2002: Jambone
2006: Demo 2006

Singles & EPs
2007: Hallway of Dreams
2008: November
2014: King of Thieves
2017: To Turn the Tables
2018: Cornelia
2021: Rise

External links
Official website

References 

Dutch heavy metal musical groups
Dutch progressive metal musical groups
Dutch symphonic metal musical groups
Musical groups established in 2001